The Witherby Memorial Lecture is an academic lectureship awarded by the British Trust for Ornithology (BTO) annually since 1968. The memorial lecture is in memorandum of Harry Forbes Witherby, a former owner of Witherby, who previously published ornithological books.

Lectures

References

Biology education in the United Kingdom
British lecture series
British Trust for Ornithology
Ornithology lists